Orienpets or Orientpets are a breed of lilies as a result of crosses between orientals and trumpets. They are commonly found under the OT hybrids in stores or nurseries.

The main characteristics of OT lilies are: plant vigor, diversity of colors, fragrance and thick texture of the petals. Many are hardy to USDA zone 4 and 3, where orientals and trumpets ar usually not.

Liliaceae
Hybrid plants